Trumbo may refer to:

Film
Trumbo (2007 film), a 2007 documentary film about Dalton Trumbo
Trumbo (2015 film), a 2015 biographical film about Dalton Trumbo, starring Bryan Cranston and Diane Lane

People
Andrew Trumbo, American politician
Arthur C. Trumbo, original owner of the A. C. Trumbo House
Christopher Trumbo (September 25, 1940 – January 8, 2011), American writer, son of Dalton Trumbo
Dalton Trumbo, American screenwriter and novelist
Isaac Trumbo, California businessman
Lewis Trumbo (1802–1869), American politician
Malfourd W. Trumbo, American politician and jurist
Mark Trumbo, American baseball player

See also
Trumbo Point, an American naval base